The Diocese of Aalborg (Danish: Aalborg Stift) is a diocese of the Church of Denmark. It was established in 1554, during the reformation. Its episcopal see is at Budolfi Cathedral and Thomas Reinholdt Rasmussen has been the diocese's bishop since 2021.

History 
The diocese was founded during the Reformation and effectively replaced the former catholic Diocese of Børglum. From Børglum, the episcopal see was initially moved to Nykøbing Mors, then to Thisted and Hjørring before finally relocating to Aalborg in 1554. Budolfi Cathedral then became the seat of the diocese.

Structure 

The diocese comprises 14 deaneries, 140 parishes, and 330 churches.

Deaneries:

 Budolfi
 Aalborg Nordre
 Aalborg Vestre
 Aalborg Østre
 Brønderslev
 Frederikshavn
 Hadsund
 Hjørring Nordre
 Hjørring Søndre
 Jammerbugt
 Rebild
 Sydthy
 Thisted
 Morsø

List of Bishops 

Laurids Nielsen, 1554–1557
Jørgen Mortensen Bornholm, 1557–1587
Jacob Holm, 1587–1609
Christen Hansen Riber, 1609–1642
Anders Andersen Ringkjøbing, 1642–1668
Morits Kønning, 1668–1672
Mathias Foss, 1672–1683
Henrik Bornemann, 1683–1693
Jens Bircherod, 1693–1708
Frands Thestrup, 1708–1735
Christoffer Mumme, 1735–1737
Broder Brorson, 1737–1778
Christian Beverlin Studsgaard, 1778–1806
Rasmus Jansen, 1806–1827
Vacant (1827–1833)
Nikolai Fogtmann, 1833–1851
Severin Claudius Wilken Bindesbøll, 1851–1856
Peter Kierkegaard, 1856–1876
Peter Engel Lind, 1875–1888
Vilhelm Carl Schousboe, 1888–1900
Fredrik Nielsen, 1900–1905
Christian Møller, 1905–1915
Christian Ludwigs, 1915–1930
Paul Oldenbourg, 1930–1940
D. von Huth Smith, 1940–1950
Erik Jensen, 1950–1970
Henrik Christiansen, 1975–1991
Søren Lodberg Hvas, 1991–2010
Henning Toft Bro, 2010–2021
Thomas Reinholdt Rasmussen, 2021–present

References

Church of Denmark dioceses
Diocese of Aalborg
1554 establishments
1550s establishments in Denmark